The Oaks, California may refer to:
The Oaks (Monrovia, California), an 1885 Queen Anne Style house
The Oaks (Thousand Oaks, California), a shopping mall
The Oaks, Los Angeles County, California, a place in California
The Oaks, Mendocino County, California, an unincorporated community
The Oaks, Nevada County, California, an unincorporated community